Orlovi Skali is a historic site in Ardino, Bulgaria.  The site consists of niches cut into a large rock standing above the forest.  The site seems to have had some religious significance.

References

Rhodope Mountains
Geography of Kardzhali Province